The Austrian Sports Personality of the Year is chosen annually since 1949. Recordholders are Annemarie Moser-Pröll (seven awards) and Marcel Hirscher (six awards). In 1978 and 1979 the Austria national football team was named Austrian Sports Team of the Year. Since 1990 this prize is included in the annual election.

See also
 Austrian Footballer of the Year
Athlete of the Year
Laureus World Sports Award for Sportsman of the Year (Laureus World Sports Academy)
Laureus World Sports Award for Sportswoman of the Year
L'Équipe Champion of Champions Award

References

Sport in Austria
National sportsperson-of-the-year trophies and awards
Austrian awards
Awards established in 1949
1949 establishments in Austria